Islam in Asia began in the 7th century during the lifetime of Muhammad. In 2020, the total number of Muslims in Asia was about 1.3 billion, it is the largest religion in Asia. Asia constitute in absolute terms the world's largest Muslim population. and about 62% of the world's Muslims live in Asia, with Indonesia, Pakistan, India, and Bangladesh having the largest Muslim populations in the world. Asia is home to the largest Muslim population, with West Asia, Central Asia, South Asia, and Southeast Asia being particularly important regions. A number of adherents of Islam have lived in Asia especially in West Asia and South Asia since the beginning of Islamic history.

History
The spread of Islam outside of the Arabian peninsula and into other parts of the continent can be linked to the extensive trade routes connecting West Asia to China. 

The Barmakid family was an early supporter of the Abbasid Revolution against the Umayyads and of As-Saffah. This gave Khalid ibn Barmak considerable influence, and his son Yaḥyā ibn Khālid (d. 806) was the vizier of the caliph al-Mahdi (ruled 775–785) and tutor of Hārūn ar-Rashīd (ruled 786–809). Yaḥyā's sons al-Faḍl and Ja'far (767–803) both occupied high offices under Harun. Many Barmakids were patrons of the sciences, which greatly helped the propagation of Indian science and scholarship from the neighboring Academy of Gundishapur into the Arabic world. They patronized scholars such as Gebir and Jabril ibn Bukhtishu. They are also credited with the establishment of the first paper mill in Baghdad. The power of the Barmakids in those times is reflected in The Book of One Thousand and One Nights; the vizier Ja'far appears in several stories, as well as a tale that gave rise to the expression “Barmecide feast”.

Many of the early governors of the Caliphate were Barmakids. Khalid ibn Barmak built Mansura, Sindh and later Baghdad. His son was the governor of what is now Azerbaijan.

Demographics

Central Asia

East Asia

South Asia

Southeast Asia

West Asia

References

External links

 Islam in Asia at the Open Directory Project